Ctenophorus scutulatus, commonly known as the lozenge-marked dragon or lozenge-marked bicycle-dragon is a species of agamid lizard occurring in semi-arid to arid zones on hard to stony soils supporting acacia woodlands and chenopod shrublands in Western Australia.

References

Agamid lizards of Australia
scutulatus
Endemic fauna of Australia
Reptiles described in 1893
Taxa named by Edward Charles Stirling
Taxa named by Amandus Heinrich Christian Zietz